Maddux House, also known as Maddux's Island, Maddux's Warehouse, Inclosure, and Capt. William T. Ford House, is a historic home located at Upper Fairmount, Somerset County, Maryland. It is located on a high ridge of land overlooking the Manokin River and Back Creek.  It is a two-story, six-bay, "L"-shaped frame house with steeply pitched roofs. The house dates to the 18th century, with an addition dating to around 1850–60.
It was listed on the National Register of Historic Places in 2002.

References

External links
, including photo from 2001, at Maryland Historical Trust

Houses in Somerset County, Maryland
Houses on the National Register of Historic Places in Maryland
Federal architecture in Maryland
Greek Revival houses in Maryland
Houses completed in 1780
National Register of Historic Places in Somerset County, Maryland